Collage sur B-A-C-H is a 1964 composition for strings, oboe, harpsichord, and piano by Arvo Pärt. The piece consists of three movements, named after and inspired by traditional Baroque forms:

 Toccata
 Sarabande
 Ricercar

References

Compositions by Arvo Pärt
1964 compositions